Uttam Guho (born 30 September) is a Bangladeshi art director of films and stage plays. He won Bangladesh National Film Award for Best Art Direction a record 10 times for the films Anya Jibon (1995), Chitra Nodir Pare (1999), Hason Raja (2002), Lalon (2004), Raja Surja Khan (2012), Mrittika Maya (2013), Shankhachil (2016), Gohin Baluchor (2017), Ekti Cinemar Golpo (2018) and Gor (The Grave) (2020).

Personal life
Guho is married to actress Chitralekha Guho. Together they have two daughters, Arnisha and Arnila.

Works

Stage plays
Sheshrokkha
Bhuboner Ghate
Phulrani Aami Tia
Anya Gazir Anya Kissa

Films
Chandragrohon (2008)
Anya Jibon (1995)
Chitra Nodir Pare (1999)
Hason Raja (2002)
Lalon (2004)
Raja Surja Khan (2012) 
Mrittika Maya (2013)
Brihonnola (2014)Jibondhuli (2014)Shankhachil (2016)Gohin Baluchor (2017)
 Ekti Cinemar Golpo (2018)
 Gor (The Grave)'' (2020)

References

External links
 

Living people
Bengali Hindus
Bangladeshi art directors
Best Art Direction National Film Award (Bangladesh) winners
Year of birth missing (living people)
Place of birth missing (living people)